The Northern Ireland national futsal team represents Northern Ireland during international futsal competitions such as the FIFA Futsal World Cup and the UEFA Euro Championships. The team is governed by the Irish Football Association. The team was formed in 2016 as futsal gained popularity in Northern Ireland in 2015.

Home matches are played at Newry Leisure Centre. Friendly matches are played with teams from other European nations, and Northern Ireland also compete in the Home Nations Championship against England, Scotland and Wales each season.  Northern Ireland entered qualification for the FIFA World Futsal Cup for the first time in 2019  and qualification for the UEFA Euro Championships for the first time in 2020.  The team have yet to advance from a qualification tournament.

Current squad

Competition History

FIFA World Cup

UEFA European Futsal Championship

Home Nations Championship

Northern Ireland Futsal Matches

Head Coaches

As of February 2020

References

2015 establishments in Northern Ireland
Men's national sports teams of Northern Ireland
Futsal in the United Kingdom